Lochwinnoch railway station was a railway station serving the village of Lochwinnoch, Renfrewshire, Scotland. The station was part of the Dalry and North Johnstone Line on the Glasgow and South Western Railway.

History 

The station opened on 1 June 1905, and closed to passengers on 27 June 1966. This station was located in the village on the north west side of Castle Semple Loch, being closer to the village centre than the original Lochwinnoch station (renamed Lochside during this station's lifetime) which is still located at the south east end of Castle Semple Loch.

Little remains of the station, although a bricked up entrance remains under a bridge. The station site is now occupied by housing, and the trackbed to the east and west is now part of National Cycle Route 7.

References

Notes

Sources 
 

Disused railway stations in Renfrewshire
Railway stations in Great Britain opened in 1905
Railway stations in Great Britain closed in 1966
Beeching closures in Scotland
Former Glasgow and South Western Railway stations